"F.N" ("Fuck Nigga") is a song by American rapper Lil Tjay, from his second EP of the same name and his debut studio album True 2 Myself (2019). The song was written by Lil Tjay, Artem Romanov, and its producer Vznare. It peaked at number 56 on the Billboard Hot 100, being Lil Tjay's highest charting song as a solo artist until 2021.

Composition 
The track features a midtempo trap beat. Lil Tjay reflects on his rise to fame, and its impact on his relationships with people he made prior to his success. In an interview with Complex, Tjay stated that the song "is just me talking about my feelings toward snitches and rats"; in the chorus, he sings about how betrayal has hardened him, with lyrics such as "Used to fuck with you, now I'm wishing that a bus hit you."

Charts

Weekly charts

Year-end charts

Certifications

References 

2019 songs
2019 singles
Lil Tjay songs
Columbia Records singles
Sony Music singles
Songs written by Lil Tjay